Ruchika Pandey is an Indian actress and fashion designer who acted in several Hindi films.

Biography
She debuted in Mirza Brothers filmYaara Dildara was also released in 1991 where Aasif Sheikh was her co-star.
Pandey's film Pyaar Ka Saudagar was released in 1991.
Pandey's film Mr. Bond was released in 1992. In this film Akshay Kumar was her co-star. She also appeared in Umar 55 Ki Dil Bachpan Ka in 1992.

Pandey is now living in Dubai and she is working there as a fashion designer. She lost AED 3,00,000 in 2018 following a SIM-swap fraud.

Filmography

References

External links
 

Living people
Indian film actresses
Actresses in Hindi cinema
Indian women fashion designers
Year of birth missing (living people)